Dan Amakye Dede (born 5 January 1958) is a Ghanaian musician. He is one of Ghana's premier high-life artists popularly referred to as "Iron Boy", "the high-life maestro" and "Abrantie". Amakye Dede was born in Agogo, Asante Akim. He attended Agogo Roman School. He is best known for classic songs such as: "Jealousy go shame", "Dabi Dabi Ebeye Yie", "Akwadaa Wesoa", and "Iron Boy."

On 2 January 2016, he was involved in an accident that killed his manager and seriously injured his bodyguard.

Amakye Dede was installed as a sub-Chief at Agogo in the Asante Akim traditional area.

Career 
Dede began his career in 1973 when he joined the Kumapim Royals as a composer and vocalist. This band, led by Akwasi Ampofo Agyei (AAA), had hits such as "Abebi Bewua Eso", "Wanware Me A", "Odo Mani Agyina", and the seminal "Ohohoo Batani". Dede moved to Nigeria, where he had his hit "Jealousy go shame".
He then formed his own band, the Apollo High Kings, in 1980. He dominated the high-life scene in the 1980s and 1990s and has continued to have hit songs in the 21st century. He has headlined so many concerts locally and internationally.

He made almost 20 albums. In his later career, he experimented with different genres: soca, calypso, lovers rock and pop music.

He owns a popular bar in Accra called Abrantee Spot, where he and other high-life musicians regularly play live-band music.

His popular songs include "Handkerchief", "Seniwa", "Brebrebe yi", "Mensuro", "Mabre", "Broken Promises", "Nsuo Amuna", "Sokoo na mmaa pe", "Kose kose", "Dabi dabi", "Mefre wo", "Okyena sesei", "Odo nfonii", "Nka akyi", "M'ani agyina", "To be a man na war", and "Iron Boy".

References

Living people
Ghanaian highlife musicians
1958 births